Peter-Erich Cremer (25 March 1911 – 5 July 1992) was a German U-boat commander during the Second World War. He was a recipient of the Knight's Cross of the Iron Cross of Nazi Germany.

Biography 
Peter-Erich Cremer was born in Metz, Alsace-Lorraine, on 25 March 1911. After high school, Cremer enlisted in the Reichsmarine in 1932. After serving on cruisers and destroyers, Cremer became captain in February 1940. He received the Iron Cross 2nd class. He was promoted to the rank of submarine commander in August 1940, and was given the U-152.

After several victorious trips, he received the Knight's Cross of the Iron Cross (Ritterkreuz des Eisernen Kreuzes) on 5 June 1942, and in that same year was severely wounded. He sailed again from 1943 until July 1944, before giving his boat to his lieutenant. In November 1944, Cremer, now Lieutenant Commander, aimed to convey the new submarine U-2519 Class XXI. Citing "several design flaws", Cremer scuttled the submarine at Kiel, in May 1945. As the War drew to a close, he was attached to the personal security unit of Karl Dönitz. In this role he was involved in the incident in which Kapitän zur See Wolfgang Lüth was shot to death by a German sentry.

Peter-Erich Cremer appeared in Episode 10: 'Wolf Pack: U-Boats in the Atlantic' of the British television documentary The World at War in the early 1970s. Later he recounted his life in his books U-333: The story of a U-boat ace and U-Boat Commander: a periscope view of the Battle of the Atlantic. He died in Hamburg on 5 July 1992.

Summary of career

Ships sunk and damaged

Awards
 Iron Cross (1939) 2nd Class (11 February 1940) & 1st Class (10 February 1942)
 Destroyer War Badge ( 19 October 1940 )
 U-boat War Badge (1939) ( 26 May 1942 )
 Knight's Cross of the Iron Cross on 5 June 1942 as Kapitänleutnant and commander of 
 Wound Badge in Silver ( 11 November 1942 )
 U-boat Front Clasp ( 27 September 1944 )

Promotions

References

Citations

Bibliography

 
 

1911 births
1992 deaths
U-boat commanders (Kriegsmarine)
Recipients of the Knight's Cross of the Iron Cross
Military personnel from Metz
People from Alsace-Lorraine
Reichsmarine personnel